Smilosicyopus is a genus of gobies native to Asia and Oceania.

Species
There are currently seven recognized species in this genus:
 Smilosicyopus bitaeniatus (Maugé, Marquet & Laboute, 1992)
 Smilosicyopus chloe (Watson, Keith & Marquet, 2001) (Chloe's Sicyopus)
 Smilosicyopus fehlmanni (Parenti & Maciolek, 1993)
 Smilosicyopus leprurus (H. Sakai & M. Nakamura, 1979)
 Smilosicyopus mystax (Watson & G. R. Allen, 1999)
 Smilosicyopus pentecost (Keith, Lord & Taillebois, 2010) (Pentecost Sicyopus)
 Smilosicyopus sasali (Keith & Marquet, 2005) (Sasal's Sicyopus)

References

Gobiidae